Transportation in New York is made up of some of the most extensive and one of the oldest transportation infrastructures in the country. Engineering difficulties because of the terrain of New York State and the unique issues of New York City brought on by urban crowding have had to be overcome since the state was young. Population expansion of the state generally followed the path of the early waterways, first the Hudson River and then the Erie Canal. Today, railroad lines and the New York State Thruway follow the same general route.

History 

Transportation was used early on to support industry and commerce in New York State. The Boston Post Road, between what then the relatively small City of New York and Boston, began as a path to deliver the post using post riders (the first ride to lay out the Upper Post Road starting January 22, 1673), and developed into a wagon, or stage road in later colonial times. During the 19th century, pieces of the road were taken over and improved by turnpike companies. In the 1910s and 1920s, the Lower Post Road alignment (and realignments made to the route) was a National Auto Trail known as the Boston Post Road. Large sections of the various routes are still given the name Boston Post Road, much of it is now U.S. Route 1.

By the American Revolutionary War, the colonial Province of New York was still small and relatively sparsely populated. In the 1790 United States Census, the state had a population of 340,120, placing it behind Virginia (747,610), Pennsylvania (434,373), Massachusetts (378,787). The state grew rapidly after this as New York City grew to become the country's shipping epicenter. On October 24, 1825, the Erie Canal opened and over the next century would make boom towns out of the Upstate cities of Buffalo, Rochester, Syracuse, Rome, Utica and Schenectady. Use of the canal would only decline after 1950. Cities in New York State would frequently show up as amongst the largest in the United States during the 19th, and into the early 20th century.

The other major contribution to New York's transportation system was its extensive railroad network. The New York Central Water Level Route was advertised as the world's first four-track railroad, and connected New York City, Buffalo, and the cities in between.

Canals
Early transportation in New York State was primarily by rivers and canals. Today, the canals are primarily used for recreation.
 Erie Canal
 New York Barge Canal

Urban mass transit 

One of the most famous urban mass transit systems in the world is the New York City Subway. New York City is also served by Port Authority Trans-Hudson (PATH), and an extensive bus system.

Besides New York City, many of the other cities have mass transit systems.

Buffalo Metro Rail serves Buffalo, the second largest city in the state. However, this service also resembles a light rail system.

Defunct 

Rochester had a subway system, although it is mostly destroyed. Only a small part exists under the old Erie Canal Aqueduct. In its day, the system would carry people underground on what were essentially streetcars. If the system still existed today, it would probably be described as a light rail service.

Rochester, Utica, and other upstate cities once had streetcar and interurban systems.

Commuter railroads
 Long Island Rail Road
 Metro-North Railroad

NJ Transit and Amtrak also serve New York City and its suburbs.

Intercity and International rail 
Like most of United States, the only intercity rail passenger service is provided by Amtrak. New York City's Pennsylvania Station is the busiest of Amtrak's rail stations.  The most successful of Amtrak's routes, the Northeast Corridor, operates between Washington, D.C., and Boston, Massachusetts. The most popular and heavily used routes in the Amtrak system are those on the Northeast Corridor, which include the Acela Express, and the Northeast Regional.

Amtrak's Empire Service trains provide frequent daily service along the 460-mile (740 km) Empire Corridor between New York City and Niagara Falls. The route was formerly the Water Level Route of the New York Central Railroad to Buffalo and then the former Buffalo and Niagara Falls Railroad. One train, known as the Maple Leaf, continues beyond Niagara Falls to Toronto, Ontario, Canada.

Recently, the state has taken more interest in increasing the frequency and speed of intercity rail, going so far as to propose the creation of a statewide high-speed rail network.

Intercity Bus 
New York City is a hub for intercity bus networks in the northeastern United States. The rest of the state is served by intercity buses run by companies such as Megabus, Greyhound Lines, Trailways of New York, OurBus, North Fork Express, Hampton Jitney, Coach USA Short Line and others.

Automobile transportation

New York Thruway

The largest single artery in New York State is the New York State Thruway, which is more than 400 miles from The Bronx to Buffalo. It follows the Hudson River between New York City and Albany with an Interstate 87 designation and the Erie Canal between Albany and the Pennsylvania border with an Interstate 90 designation.

Parkways

New York is home to many parkways built by Robert Moses. Among his projects are the Brooklyn-Queens Expressway, the Staten Island Expressway, the Cross-Bronx Expressway, the Belt Parkway, the Laurelton Parkway, and many more.

Other parkways include the Cross County Parkway and Saw Mill River Parkway in Westchester, the Taconic State Parkway, the Palisades Interstate Parkway, the Northern State Parkway and the Southern State Parkway (the latter two both in Long Island).

Bridges

New York City
 George Washington Bridge, spanning the Hudson River between New York City and Fort Lee, New Jersey, the world's busiest motor vehicle bridge.
 Verrazzano-Narrows Bridge
 Brooklyn Bridge
 Manhattan Bridge
 Williamsburg Bridge
 Ed Koch Queensboro Bridge
 Triborough Bridge
 Bronx–Whitestone Bridge
 Throgs Neck Bridge

Elsewhere in New York State
 Tappan Zee Bridge
 Peace Bridge
 Lake Champlain Bridge

Tunnels
Most tunnels in the state of New York are within New York City.
 Holland Tunnel - a partially tolled tunnel that connects Lower Manhattan to Jersey City across the Hudson River
 Lincoln Tunnel - a partially tolled tunnel that connects Midtown Manhattan to Weehawken, NJ across the Hudson River
 Brooklyn–Battery Tunnel - a tolled tunnel that connects Battery Park to Brooklyn
 Park Avenue Tunnel - a one-way tunnel underneath a portion Park Avenue in Midtown Manhattan

Interstates

North-South Interstates

The principal north–south highways are as follows:
 
 
 
 

Interstate 81 has two auxiliary routes, Interstate 481 and Interstate 781.

Interstate 87 has three auxiliary routes: Interstate 287, Interstate 587, and Interstate 787.

Interstate 95 has three auxiliary routes: Interstate 295, Interstate 495, and Interstate 695.

East-West Interstates
The principal east–west highways are as follows:
  (the part of the Holland Tunnel that is in New York State, originally planned as the Lower Manhattan Expressway)
 
 
 
 

Interstate 78 has four auxiliary routes: Interstate 278, Interstate 478, Interstate 678, and Interstate 878. All were planned to connect to Interstate 78, but none of them currently do.

Interstate 84 has one auxiliary route, Interstate 684.

Interstate 86 and Interstate 88 have no auxiliary routes.

Interstate 90 has nine auxiliary routes: Interstate 190, Interstate 290, Interstate 390, Interstate 490, Interstate 590, Interstate 690, Interstate 790, Interstate 890, and Interstate 990.

Other highways

Safety
Between 2010 and 2014, NYS has between 1039 and 1202 yearly road traffic fatalities, that is between 8 and 8.3 fatalities by billion miles traveled.
Pedestrian fatalities are between yearly 263 and 336.

In the NY state, pedestrians are one out of 4 fatalities, each year. Those fatalities are due to unsafe actions both from motorists and from pedestrians.

NY state is one of the fives US states with the most pedestrian fatalities: 879 fatalities of which 294 (33%) occurred at intersections.

Bicycle

New York has a system of numbered state bicycle routes.

Transportation in New York City 

New York City boasts one of the most extensive urban transportation systems in the world, including two distinct mass transit systems:
 New York City Subway - by some measures, the most extensive rapid transit system in the world
 Staten Island Railway - not technically part of the Subway, but serves a similar purpose on the Borough of Staten Island; isolated from the national rail network and the New York City Subway
 Port Authority Trans-Hudson - rapid transit between Manhattan and New Jersey
New York City's automobile network is also extensive. It includes many bridges and limited access highways built by Robert Moses, and is integrated with a street grid that dates to the early 19th century.

While extensive, much of New York City's infrastructure is aging and in need of capital investment. Despite the lack of expansion and investment during the past few decades, many infrastructure projects including the Second Avenue Subway, 7 Subway Extension, Fulton Center, and the East Side Access have already started construction during the 2000s.

Transportation on Long Island

Every major form of transportation serves Long Island, including three major airports, railroads and subways, and several major highways. There are historic and modern bridges, recreational and commuter trails, and ferries as well.

The Long Island Expressway, Northern State Parkway, and Southern State Parkway, all products of the automobile-centered planning of Robert Moses, make east–west travel on the island straightforward, if not always quick. Indeed, locals refer to Long Island Expressway as "The World's Longest Parking Lot".

There are currently ten road crossings out of Long Island, all within New York City limits at the extreme western end of the island.  Plans for a Long Island Sound link at various locations in Nassau and Suffolk Counties have been discussed for decades, but there are currently no firm plans to construct such a crossing.

The Long Island Rail Road is the busiest commuter railroad system in North America, carrying an average of 282,400 customers each weekday on 728 daily trains. Chartered on April 24, 1834, it is also the oldest railroad still operating under its original name.

Proposals

Commuter rail
See:
 New York high-speed rail

Mass transit
 The Second Avenue Subway is under construction in New York City.

Proposed light rail systems
New York presently only boasts the Buffalo Metro Rail, which is arguably a light rail system. Proposals include:
 Capital district light rail (with former State Senate Majority Leader Joseph Bruno voicing support)
 42nd Street Light Rail
 Staten Island light rail proposals
 Rochester is entertaining the idea of getting light rail service. The city has been discussing what to do with the right of way used by its former subway system. The city wants to use the right of way, which used to be the route of the Erie Canal, for light rail, recreate the canal, or fill the trench.

See also

New York State Department of Transportation
New York State Department of Motor Vehicles
New York City Department of Transportation
 Plug-in electric vehicles in New York (state)

References